Hawtreys Preparatory School was a private boys' preparatory school in England, first established in Slough, later moved to Westgate-on-Sea, then to Oswestry, and finally to a country house near Great Bedwyn, Wiltshire. In its early years it was known as St Michael's School.

In 1994, the school merged into Cheam School, near Newbury, Berkshire.

History
The school was founded in 1869 by the Reverend John Hawtrey.  He had been a boy at Eton, from the age of eight.  In later life he became a master at Eton and was offered his own house of boys.  He decided to remove all of the younger boys from the school.  With the permission of Eton College, he took the lowest two forms out to a separate school in Slough and housed them in what is now St Bernard's Catholic Grammar School, Slough.  This was known as St Michael's School, and was opened on 29 September 1869 (St Michael's day).

John Hawtrey's son, Edward, removed the school to Westgate-on-Sea early in 1883. When Edward Hawtrey died, the name of the school was changed to Hawtreys.

The school buildings were requisitioned during the Second World War and the school moved to Oswestry in Shropshire, to the home of Sir William Wynn-Williams. In 1946 it moved to Tottenham House, a large Palladian country house near the village of Great Bedwyn, Wiltshire, in the heart of the Savernake Forest. Throughout the history of the school, a close connection was maintained with Eton College to which many boys moved at the age of thirteen.

In 1994, the school merged with Cheam School, near Newbury, Berkshire, which is formally called Cheam Hawtreys, but generally known simply as Cheam.

The staff and pupils were listed in the credits of A Feast at Midnight, a 1995 British comedy family film.

Old Hawtreyans
And see :Category:People educated at Hawtreys

Field Marshal Lord Alexander (1891–1969)
Sir Euan Anstruther-Gough-Calthorpe, 3rd Baronet (born 1966), property manager
Stanley Baldwin, 1st Earl Baldwin of Bewdley KG (1867–1947), British prime minister
George Barclay, Battle of Britain pilot
Johnnie Boden, shirt-manufacturer
David Brudenell-Bruce, Earl of Cardigan (born 1952)
Detmar Blow (1867–1939), architect
Henry Cookson Guinness Book of Records as member of first team to reach the Antarctic Pole of inaccessibility in 2007
Robert St Leger Fowler (1891–1925), cricketer
Zac Goldsmith (born 1975), Conservative politician, environmentalist and editor of The Ecologist
George Peabody Gooch (1873–1968), historian, social and political activist
Simon Hart (born 1963), Conservative politician and Secretary of State for Wales
Thomas Lange, hotelier, philanthropist, & author
Dai Llewellyn, 4th Baronet (1946-2009), socialite
Sir Roderic Victor Llewellyn, 5th Baronet (born 1947), partner of Princess Margaret and horticulturalist
Oliver Messel (1904–1978), artist and stage designer
Jake Meyer, Mountaineer
Sir Anthony Rupert Milburn, 5th Baronet (born 1947), landowner
Edward Moss (1911–1944), first-class cricketer and Royal Air Force Volunteer Reserve officer
Sir Peter O'Sullevan (1918–2015), BBC racing commentator
John Seymour, 19th Duke of Somerset (born 1952)
Henry Somerset, 12th Duke of Beaufort (born 1952)
Mark Stone, journalist and Sky News Foreign Correspondent

Notes

External links 
Cheam School

1994 disestablishments in England
1869 establishments in England
Boarding schools in Berkshire
Boarding schools in Kent
Boarding schools in Wiltshire
Boys' schools in Berkshire
Boys' schools in Kent
Boys' schools in Wiltshire
Defunct schools in Berkshire
Defunct schools in Kent
Defunct schools in Wiltshire
Educational institutions disestablished in 1994
Educational institutions established in 1869
Defunct boarding schools in England